José Jasso (1911–1968) was a Mexican character actor best known for his large, bulging eyes which earned him the nickname "El Ojón".  He was mostly cast in comic supporting roles from 1945 to 1967. Jasso often appeared in films starring Eulalio González and Viruta y Capulina.

Selected filmography
 Madman and Vagabond (1946)
El rey del barrio (1949)
 You Had To Be a Gypsy (1953)
 Mi adorada Clementina (1953)
 Barefoot Sultan (1956)
Se los chupó la bruja (1958)
De tal palo tal astilla (1960)
 Two Cheap Husbands (1960)
Pegando con tubo (1961)
Ruletero a toda marcha (1962)
El rey del tomate (1963)
La cigüeña distraída (1966)

References

External links

1911 births
1968 deaths
Mexican male film actors
20th-century Mexican male actors